The Stampe et Vertongen SV.4 (also known incorrectly as the Stampe SV.4 or just Stampe) is a Belgian two-seat trainer/tourer biplane designed and built by Stampe et Vertongen. The aircraft was also built under licence in France and French Algeria.

History

The SV.4 was designed as a biplane tourer/training aircraft in the early 1930s, by Stampe et Vertongen in Antwerp. The first model was the SV.4A, an advanced aerobatic trainer, followed by the SV.4B with redesigned wings and the 130 hp/97 kW de Havilland Gipsy Major engine.

Only 35 aircraft were built before the company was closed during the Second World War. After the war the successor company Stampe et Renard built a further 65 aircraft between 1948 and 1955 as trainers for the Belgian Air Force.

A licensed SV.4C version was built in France by SNCAN (Société Nationale de Constructions Aéronautiques du Nord), and in Algeria by Atelier Industriel de l'Aéronautique d'Alger, the two firms completing a combined total of 940 aircraft. The postwar SV.4Cs were widely used by French military units as a primary trainer. Many also served in aero clubs in France, numbers of which were later sold second hand to the United Kingdom and other countries. The Rothmans Aerobatic Team flew SV.4C aircraft from 1970 to 1973.

Variants
SV.4 prototype
SV.4A aerobatic trainer with 140 hp/104 kW Renault 4P-O5 engine
SV.4B improved version with 130 hp/97 kW de Havilland Gipsy Major I. Postwar trainers for the BAF were fitted with more powerful Cirrus Major or Gipsy Major X engine
SV.4C licence-built version with 140 hp/104 kW Renault 4Pei engine
SV.4D one aircraft re-engined with 175 hp/130 kW Mathis G.4R engine

A few SV.4s have been fitted with other engines, such as the Lycoming O-320, Ranger 6 or LOM 332b. At least one aircraft fitted with a Lycoming engine (OO-KAT) has been referred to by its owners as an SV.4E.

Military operators

Belgian Air Force

Force Publique

French Air Force
French Army
French Navy

Royal Air Force
No. 510 Squadron RAF operated one aircraft "liberated" by Belgian pilots Léon Divoy and Michel Donnet in 1941, and flown from occupied Belgium to England.

Specifications (Post-War SV.4B)

See also

References

Further reading

 Pacco, John. "Stampe & Vertongen SV-4B" Belgisch Leger/Armee Belge: Het Militair Vliegwezen/l'Aeronautique Militaire 1930-1940. Aartselaar, Belgium, 2003, pp. 85–86. .

1930s Belgian sport aircraft
1930s Belgian military trainer aircraft
Stampe et Vertongen aircraft
Aerobatic aircraft
Single-engined tractor aircraft
Biplanes
Aircraft first flown in 1933